This is a list of the 2015 RFL Championship season results. The Championship is the second-tier rugby league competition in the United Kingdom. The season started on 13 February. 2015 is the first season to consist of a 12-team division, as part of the Rugby Football League's reform of the leagues.

The regular season will be played over 24 round-robin fixtures, where each of the twelve teams involved in the competition play each other, once at home and once away. In the Championship, points are only gained for a win, which are worth two points, or a draw, which is worth one point. No bonus points will be awarded this season.

The play-offs will commence after the round-robin fixtures. The top four teams in the Championship will qualify for "The Qualifiers", along with the bottom four teams in the Super League. Each team's points totals will be reset to zero and each team will play against each other once. The top three teams will qualify automatically for the Super League in 2016, the fourth and fifth-placed teams will contest the "Million Pound Game" at the venue of the fourth-placed team, with the winner also earning a place in the Super League for 2016, while  the losing team and the bottom three teams will enter the Championship in 2016.

The fifth-twelfth placed teams in the Championship in 2015 will contest the "Championship Shield", where each team will play seven extra games, retaining their original points. The top four teams will contest play-offs, with the first-placed team facing the fourth-placed team and the second-placed team facing the third-placed team; The two winning teams will then contest the Championship Shield Grand Final. The bottom two teams will be relegated to League 1 in 2016.

Regular season

Round 1

Round 2

Round 3

Round 4

Round 5

Round 6

Round 7

Round 8

Round 9

Round 10

References

External links
Official Website

RFL Championship results